is a railway station in Tokyo, Japan, operated by the East Japan Railway Company (JR East) and Tokyo subway operator Tokyo Metro.

Lines
Ochanomizu Station is serviced by the following lines:

Chūō Main Line (including Chūō Line and Chūō-Sōbu Line)
Sōbu Main Line (including Chūō-Sōbu Line)

Passengers can also transfer to nearby Shin-ochanomizu Station on the Tokyo Metro Chiyoda Line.

Location
JR East's Ochanomizu station lies south of the Kanda River in Chiyoda ward. During the Edo period, the Kanda River was rerouted to pass through Ochanomizu, which was otherwise a highland between two valleys. Hijiribashi (聖橋, also known as Hijiri Bridge, Hijiribashi Bridge) crosses over the river near a station exit. The subway Marunouchi Line makes a short above-ground appearance as it passes over the river. Holy Resurrection Cathedral (Nicholai-dō) is easily accessible from the Hijiribashi Exit of this station. The Ochanomizu neighborhood is known for its many guitar and instrument shops.

The Tokyo Metro station is located in Bunkyō Ward, separate from the JR East station, and is served by the Marunouchi Line.

JR East

The JR East portion of the station has two island platforms serving four tracks. Tracks 1 and 4 (the outer tracks) serve trains on the Chūō Line whilst tracks 2 and 3 are used by trains on the Chūō-Sōbu Line.

Platforms

There are two exits from Ochanomizu to street level. The larger of the two is the Ochanomizu-bashi exit on the western end of the station which features ticket vending machines, a JR reservation office, toilets, and lockers. The other is the Hijiri-bashi exit which only has ticket vending machines and toilets.

Tokyo Metro

The Tokyo Metro station consists of two side platforms serving two tracks.

Platforms

History
The JR East station opened on 31 December 1904. The Tokyo Metro station opened on 20 January 1954.

Passenger statistics
In fiscal 2013, the JR East station was used by 104,737 passengers daily (boarding passengers only), making it the 34th-busiest station operated by JR East. In fiscal 2013, the Tokyo Metro station was used by an average of 55,529 passengers per day (exiting and entering passengers), making it the 66th-busiest station operated by Tokyo Metro. The average daily passenger figures for each operator in previous years are as shown below.

 Note that JR East figures are for boarding passengers only.

Surrounding area
　Shin-Ochanomizu Station
　Akihabara
　Jinbōchō
　Kanda River
　Kanda Shrine
　Manseibashi
　Yasukuni-dōri

Connecting bus services
The Toei Bus operates local bus services from the following Ochanomizu Station bus stops.

Ochanomizu-ekimae (Ochanomizu Station)

No.1
 Cha 51: for Komagome-eki-minamiguchi (Komagome Station South Entrance)

No.2
 Cha 51: for Akihabara-ekimae (Akihabara Station)

No.3
 Higashi 43: for Tokyo-eki-Marunouchi-kitaguchi (Tokyo Station Marunouchi North Entrance)

No.4
 Higashi 43: for Arakawa-dote-sōshajō-mae (Arakawa Riverbank Depot) and Kōhoku-ekimae (Kōhoku Station)

Ochanomizu-ekimae (Higashi-guchi) (Ochanomizu Station (East Entrance))

No.5
 Gaku 07: for Tōdai-kōnai (The University of Tokyo Hongo Campus)

See also

 List of railway stations in Japan

References

External links

 JR East station information 
 Tokyo Metro station information 

Chūō-Sōbu Line
Sōbu Main Line
Chūō Main Line
Tokyo Metro Marunouchi Line
Stations of East Japan Railway Company
Stations of Tokyo Metro
Railway stations in Tokyo
Kanda, Tokyo
Railway stations in Japan opened in 1904